Lydia Mei (2 July 1896 - 14 September 1965) was an Estonian artist who specialized in watercolors.

Born on the Estonian island of Hiiumaa, Lydia Mei was the middle child of the three daughters of a ship's captain. All three sisters would become artists, with Lydia Mei and Natalie Mei achieving public prominence during the Neue Sachlichkeit (New Objectivity) period of Estonian art of the 1920s and sister Kristine Mei becoming a sculptor.

Mei studied architecture at the Petrograd Women's Polytechnic Institute until 1918. But she became famous as a watercolorist in late 1920s. She married sculptor Anton Starkopf and is occasionally credited with the name Lydia Mei-Starkopf. She died in 1965 in the capital city of Tallinn.

References

Pihlak, Elvi: "Lydia Mei - Natüürmortide ja lillemaalide meister" in: Kunst Vol. 1962,1 pgs 16–20. Tallinn.

External links
Self Portrait (1931) retrieved May 3, 2007
Mai Lewin : Neue Sachlichkeit in Estonian Art retrieved May 3, 2007

1896 births
1965 deaths
Estonian women painters
People from Hiiumaa Parish
20th-century Estonian painters
20th-century Estonian women artists
Sibling artists